The second senatorial elections of the Fifth Republic were held in France on September 23, 1962.

Context 
This election has depended largely of the results of 1959 municipal elections.

Results

Senate Presidency 
On October 2, 1962, Gaston Monnerville was re-elected president of the Senate.

List of senators elected

References 

1962
1962 elections in France